He's All That is a 2021 American teen romantic comedy film directed by Mark Waters, from a screenplay by R. Lee Fleming Jr. The film is a gender-swapped remake of the 1999 film She's All That, which was a modern adaptation of George Bernard Shaw's 1913 play Pygmalion and George Cukor's 1964 film My Fair Lady. It stars Addison Rae, Tanner Buchanan, Madison Pettis, and Peyton Meyer, as well as Rachael Leigh Cook and Matthew Lillard, who starred in She's All That, appearing in different roles.

Talks for a remake of She's All That began in September 2020, with Waters to direct, Fleming Jr. set to return as the film's screenwriter, and Rae to star. Principal photography began in December 2020 in Los Angeles, California.

He's All That had its world premiere at the NeueHouse in Hollywood, California on August 25, 2021, before debuting on Netflix on August 27, 2021. The film received generally negative reviews.

Plot
Padgett Sawyer is a TikTok influencer in her final year of high school who lives with her divorced mother, a local nurse. She pretends to live in an upscale condo in order to hide her real living conditions from her followers and sponsors. 

One day, Padgett discovers that her boyfriend, influencer and aspiring hip hop artist Jordan Van Draanen, ditched her for a backup dancer. She finds herself humiliated when a live stream of her outburst results in her loss of followers and sponsorship deals.

To redeem herself, Padgett accepts a bet to turn the school's least popular young man, Cameron Kweller, an antisocial photography student, into prom king. Despite his indifference towards her, Padgett continues with the bet. She gains information about him from his younger sister Brin, and to become closer, begins taking horse riding lessons with him. 

Over time, while keeping her word on the bet, Padgett begins to bond more with Cameron and discovers that he and his younger sister lost their mother years ago in a plane crash and that they live with their grandmother while their father is residing in Sweden. Padgett fixes up Cameron's appearance and attire, and tries expanding his social interactions at her friend Quinn's party, where he saves her from suffering humiliation when Jordan appears with the girl he cheated on her with.

At Padgett's friend Alden's Great Gatsby-themed birthday party, Cameron gets into a fight with Jordan when he tries to get sexual with Brin. His mother's camera is ruined in the process, causing him to leave the party in a rage despite Padgett's attempts to console him. She regrets following through with the bet, but she does not back down from it. 

The next day, Alden turns on Padgett, revealing her plot to become prom queen alongside Jordan and her true colors. She is also responsible for intentionally live-streaming Padgett's outburst. Padgett begins to fall for Cameron but she is afraid to express her feelings after she kisses him. When Brin finds out that Padgett kissed Cameron, she advises him to ask her to prom. 

In an attempt to ensure Padgett's loss, Alden exposes the bet she made with Padgett to Cameron, who now believes that Padgett only showed interest because of the bet. On the day of the prom, Padgett's mother encourages her to still go, telling her to be herself and not the social influencer.

Cameron refuses to go to prom but Brin, realizing that her older brother has been smiling for the first time since their mother's death and Padgett came into his life, persuades him to go. He doesn't show up and Padgett declines her role as Prom Queen. She then finds Cameron outside the school on a horse and kisses him after apologizing. 

After the prom, Padgett gains her fan following back and takes her social media influencing in a new direction, by travelling to various different destinations across the world alongside Cameron, now her devoted boyfriend.

Cast

 Addison Rae as Padgett Sawyer, a social media influencer who is hiding the fact that she is poor from her affluent high school
 Tanner Buchanan as Cameron Kweller, an anti-social rebel who likes to take photographs
 Madison Pettis as Alden Pierce, Padgett's affluent and social status-aware best friend, later rival
 Peyton Meyer as Jordan Van Draanen, Padgett's ex boyfriend who is a hip-hop artist and also a social media influencer
 Rachael Leigh Cook as Anna Sawyer, Padgett's mother who works as a nurse. Cook returns from She's All That, in a different role, having originally played Laney Boggs.
 Matthew Lillard as Principal Bosch, the school's principal. Lillard returns from She's All That, in a different role, having originally played Brock Hudson.
 Isabella Crovetti as Brin Kweller, Cameron's popularity-seeking younger sister
 Myra Molloy as Quinn, Padgett's other best friend, who is more supportive of her than Alden is. She and Nisha go to prom together.
 Annie Jacob as Nisha, Cameron's best and only friend

 Kourtney Kardashian as Jessica Miles Torres, who sponsors Padgett on social media
 Vanessa Dubasso as Aniston, a dancer that Jordan becomes involved with
 Heather Ann Gottlieb as Celeste, a rebel who despises the high school experience even more than Cameron does
 Romel De Silva as Sebastian Woo, a student who excels in science
 Andrew Matarazzo as Jordan's friend Logan
 Dominic Goodman as Jordan's friend Track
 Jill Basey as Grandma, Cameron and Brin's grandmother who has taken them in to live with her
 Evan Fields as Prom DJ Jamal, the prom's DJ

Production
In September 2020, a gender swapped remake of She's All That was announced by Miramax titled He's All That, with Mark Waters to direct, original screenwriter R. Lee Fleming Jr. to write, and Addison Rae to star. Tanner Buchanan had also been cast, along with Myra Molloy, Madison Pettis, Peyton Meyer, Isabella Crovetti, and Annie Jacob.

In December 2020, Rachael Leigh Cook joined the cast to portray Rae's character's mother. It was confirmed Cook's character is not related to her original character. Andrew Matarazzo, Vanessa Dubasso, Brian Torres, Romel De Silva, Dominic Goodman, Ryan Hollis, and Tiffany Simon also joined the production.

Filming took place at Union Station, Los Angeles, in December 2020. The city was criticized for its decision to close a COVID-19 testing site to accommodate the filmmakers. The decision was reversed and the testing site was able to continue working while the filming took place. In August 2021, the song "Kiss Me" was covered by Cyn for the film's soundtrack.

Soundtrack
List of songs featured in 'He's All That'

Release
He's All That had its world premiere at the NeueHouse in Hollywood, California on August 25, 2021, before it was released on August 27, 2021, by Netflix. According to Netflix, it was the number one film on their service that week.

Reception

On Rotten Tomatoes, the film has an approval rating of 29% based on reviews from 58 critics, with an average rating of 4/10. The website's critics consensus read, "Hobbled by a lack of chemistry between its stars, He's All That comes up short on numerous opportunities to improve upon its gender-swapped source material." On Metacritic, the film has a weighted average score of 36 out of 100 based on reviews from 22 critics, indicating "generally unfavorable reviews".

Courtney Howard of Variety said "He's All That makes some smart alterations to the original despite mimeographing the structure, and strikes a benevolent balance between old and new with a light sprinkling of references. However, there are many more maddeningly underwhelming elements." ABC News' Peter Travers gave a negative review, saying "manufactured for the Kissing Booth crowd, this gender-swapped, TikTok-friendly update of the 1999 teen hit sounds awful and it often is, but enough charm pokes through the cracks to sucker anyone who ever fell for a makeover fable." Robyn Bahr of The Hollywood Reporter wrote: "He's All That may be a flattened reflection of its predecessor, but both films are charming enough to get away with about one anal sex innuendo joke apiece" and that the film "is really no worse than the first film."

Nell Minow, writing for RogerEbert.com, was more positive in her review of the film, giving it a score of 3 out of 4 stars. She wrote: "sweet little end of summer sorbet with appealing young performers and a script that refreshes the original without overdoing it." Michael Ordoña of the Los Angeles Times gave a mostly positive review by stating "You'll be pleased to discover the entertaining remake has its charms; it actually is all that, for the most part."

References

External links
 
 

2020s coming-of-age comedy films
2020s high school films
2020s teen comedy films
2020s teen romance films
2021 films
2021 romantic comedy films
American coming-of-age comedy films
Remakes of American films
American high school films
American romantic comedy films
American teen comedy films
American teen romance films
Comedy film remakes
Coming-of-age romance films
2020s English-language films
Films directed by Mark Waters
Films impacted by the COVID-19 pandemic
Films produced by Jennifer Gibgot
Films scored by Rolfe Kent
Films shot in Los Angeles
Miramax films
Romance film remakes
Works by R. Lee Fleming Jr.
Films about social media
Films about photographers
2020s American films